House Armed Services Subcommittee on Oversight and Investigations is a subcommittee of the House Armed Services Committee in the United States House of Representatives.

Jurisdiction

The Oversight and Investigations Subcommittee has no legislative jurisdiction, but has responsibility of any matter within the Armed Services Committee's jurisdiction, subject to concurrence of the chairman of the full committee any chairmen of any affected subcommittees.

Members, 115th Congress

External links
House Armed Services Committee home page
House Armed Services Committee subcommittee list and membership page

Armed Services Oversight and Investigations